Mahboob College High School is a college located in Secunderabad a twin city of Hyderabad, India.

History
It was established in 1862 by Somasundaram Mudaliar, with the name - Anglo Vernacular School. Sixth Nizam, Mir Mahbub Ali Khan made generous contribution and the school was renamed Mahboob College High School.

Notable alumni
 Shyam Benegal
 Mohammad Azharuddin
 Admiral Ram Dass Katari
 M L Jaisimha
 Mohan Kanda

See also 
Education in India
Literacy in India
List of institutions of higher education in Telangana

References

External links

[Located in main road Rastrapathi Road Secunderabad.]

Universities and colleges in Hyderabad, India
Educational institutions established in 1862
Schools in Secunderabad
1862 establishments in India